Aspey is an English surname. Notable people by that name include:

 James Aspey (born 1986), Australian animal rights activist and lecturer
 Mal Aspey (born 1947), English former professional rugby league footballer
 Vincent Aspey (1909–1987), New Zealand musician

English-language surnames